Barysh is a town and the administrative center of Baryshsky District in Ulyanovsk Oblast, Russia, located on the river Barysh (Volga's basin),  southwest of Ulyanovsk, the administrative center of the oblast. Population:

History
It was founded in 1954 after the merger of urban-type settlements of Barysh and Guryevka.

Administrative and municipal status
Within the framework of administrative divisions, Barysh serves as the administrative center of Baryshsky District. As an administrative division, it is incorporated within Baryshsky District as the town of district significance of Barysh. As a municipal division, the town of district significance of Barysh is incorporated within Baryshsky Municipal District as Baryshskoye Urban Settlement.

Economy
Baryshsky meat plant, which produces canned meat stew for the Ministry of Defense, Ministry of Internal Affairs, Ministry of Emergency Situations, Federal Security Service, and Federal Protective Service, is located is Barysh.

References

Notes

Sources

External links
Official website of Barysh 
Directory of organizations in Barysh 

Cities and towns in Ulyanovsk Oblast